The elbow is a joint of an arm.

Elbow may also refer to:

Places
Canada
Elbow, Saskatchewan, a village
Elbow River, a river

United States
Elbow, Illinois, an unincorporated community
Elbow, Texas, an unincorporated community
The Elbow (reef), a coral reef in the Florida Keys

Surname
Peter Elbow, American academic

Other
Elbow (band), an English rock band
Elbow, a song by King Gizzard & the Lizard Wizard, see 12 Bar Bruise
Elbow (knot)
Elbow (lunar crater)
Elbow (strike), an attack using the elbow
Elbow of a curve
Elbow method (clustering)
Elbow witch, a figure in Ojibwa folklore
Elbow macaroni
Elbow, a location in the key in the sport of basketball
Elbow fitting, a type of pipe fitting
Street elbow, a variant of the elbow pipe fitting
A character in William Shakespeare's Measure for Measure

See also
Elbow Lake (disambiguation)